The Coptic diaspora consists of Copts who live outside of their primary area of residence within parts of present-day Egypt, Libya and Sudan.

The number of Copts outside Egypt has sharply increased since the 1960s. The largest Coptic diaspora populations are in the United States, in Canada and in Australia, but Copts have a presence in many other countries.

Population 

Copts in Egypt make up about 10–20% of the population.

Copts in Sudan make up about half a million or 1.5% of Sudanese population.

There are about 60,000 Copts in Libya, 1% of Libyan population, making up the majority of that country's Christian community.

Outside of the traditional Coptic areas in Egypt, Sudan and Libya, the largest Coptic diaspora populations are in the United States, in Canada and in Australia.

According to one scholar: "Estimations of the actual number of Egyptian Copts (and their descendants leaving abroad vary enormously, with those circulated by Coptic expatriate activists. The biggest Coptic community abroad, that of the United States, included up to 1,000,000 persons in the late 2010s according to Coptic advocacy groups, but only 300,000 according to the Coptic Orthodox Church in the United States itself, and even less—roughly between 100,000 and 200,000—according to the scarce statistical evidence supplied by the Egyptian and U.S. governments." 

Smaller communities of Copts exist in Australia (estimated 32,000 in 2006) and in Canada (estimates vary: one 2001 estimate placed the population at 10,000 while a 1995 estimate placed the population at 50,000). 

 

Smaller communities (under 10,000 people) exist in Britain, France, Germany, Austria, Switzerland, and Italy.

In 2009 one scholar placed the total Coptic population of North America at more than 500,000.

In 1999, it was reported that there were "over eighty Coptic churches, two theological colleges, and a monastery in the United States in Canada; twenty-five churches, a theological college, three schools, and two monasteries in Australia, and thirty churches and two monasteries in Europe."

There is also a Coptic presence in Lebanon and Jordan, and well as the Arab states of the Persian Gulf, such as the United Arab Emirates. There is also a Coptic presence (due to recent missionary work) in the sub-Saharan African countries of Zambia, Kenya, The Democratic Republic of the Congo, Zimbabwe, Namibia, and South Africa.

Causes and history of the Coptic diaspora 
The Coptic diaspora began primarily in the 1950s as result of discrimination, persecution of Copts and low income in Egypt. After Gamal Abdel Nasser rose to power, economic and social conditions deteriorated and many wealthier Egyptians, especially Copts, emigrated to Europe and the United States. Emigration increased following the 1967 Arab-Israeli war, and the emigration of poorer and less-educated Copts increased after 1972, when the World Council of Churches and other religious groups began assisting Coptic immigration. Emigration of Egyptian Copts increased under Anwar al-Sadat (with many taking advantage of Sadat's "open door" policy to leave the country) and under Hosni Mubarak.

Many Copts are university graduates in the professions, such as medicine and engineering.

Identity 
According to Mariz Tadros, the discourse that refers to Copts as the original inhabitants of the land [Egypt] and others as having less claims to it, which she described as "supremacist and exclusionary", is adopted by some Copts living in the diaspora, such as Shawky Karas. However, she added that this discourse "doesn't have much currency, whether among the coptic intelligentsia in Egypt or among the Coptic population at large." On the other hand, the mainstream discourse adopted by Coptic historians presents a common Egyptian history binding together all Egyptians.

See also 
 List of Copts
 Coptic Orthodox Church in Asia
 Coptic Orthodox Church in Malaysia
 Coptic Orthodox Church in Europe
 French Coptic Orthodox Church
 Coptic Orthodox Church in Britain and Ireland
 Coptic Orthodox Church in North America
 Coptic Orthodox Church in Canada
 Coptic Orthodox Church in Mexico
 List of Coptic Orthodox Churches in Canada
 Coptic Orthodox Church in South America

References

External links 

 
Diaspora